White tea may refer to one of several styles of tea which generally feature young or minimally processed leaves of the Camellia sinensis plant.

Currently there is no generally accepted definition of white tea and very little international agreement; some sources use the term to refer to tea that is merely dried with no additional processing, some to tea made from the buds and immature tea leaves picked shortly before the buds have fully opened and allowed to wither and dry in natural sun, while others include tea buds and very young leaves which have been steamed or fired before drying. Most definitions agree, however, that white tea is not rolled or oxidized, resulting in a flavor characterized as "lighter" than most green or traditional black teas.

In spite of its name, sweet, brewed white tea is pale yellow.  Its name derives from the fine silvery-white hairs on the unopened buds of the tea plant, which give the plant a whitish appearance. The unopened buds are used for some types of white tea.

It is harvested primarily in China, mostly in the Fujian province, but more recently produced in Taiwan, Eastern Nepal, Thailand, Galle (Southern Sri Lanka) and northeast India.

History 
What is today known as white tea may have come into creation in the last two centuries; scholars and tea merchants generally disagree as to when the first production of white tea (as it is understood in China today) began. White tea may have first appeared in English publication in 1876, where it was categorized as a black tea, because the leaves are not steamed first as in the making of green tea in order to denature intrinsic oxidative enzymes.

White tea is often sold as Silvery Tip Pekoe in the style of the tea leaf grading system, as well as under the simple designations China White and Fujian White.

Some tea from the related wild Camellia taliensis in Yunnan is made using white tea processing techniques.

Composition 
White tea, like black and green tea, is made from the Camellia sinensis plant and contains polyphenols, a set of phytonutrients that are thought to be responsible for the health effects of tea. Different white teas have different amounts of catechins, a category of polyphenols, and the overall range of concentrations overlaps with that of green tea, meaning that some white teas have the same concentration of polyphenols as some green teas. This may be due to the variety of the tea plant from which the tea was picked, the cultivation technique, and the way in which the tea was processed.

Manufacturing 
The base process for manufacturing white tea is as follows:
Fresh tea leaf → withering → drying (air drying, solar drying or mechanical drying) → white tea

White tea belongs to the group of tea that does not require panning, rolling or shaking. However, the selection of raw material in white tea manufacture is extremely stringent; only the plucking of young tea leaves with much fine hair can produce good-quality white tea of a high pekoe (grading) value.

Popular types of white tea 
 Bai Mudan (white peony) 
 Shou Mei tea
 Silver Needle tea

References

Further reading 

 
 
 
 

 
Chinese tea